The principles of democratic structuring were defined by Jo Freeman in "The Tyranny of Structurelessness", first delivered as a talk in 1970, later published in the Berkeley Journal of Sociology in 1972.  They were influential in power network theories, especially those challenging a single command hierarchy.  She was a major influence in the theory of participatory democracy, consensus decision-making and collective intelligence, though her own work focused mostly on problems of elite formation in the American women's movement of the 1960s.

Elites 

"The characteristic prerequisite for participating in all the informal elites of the movement, and thus for exercising power, concern one's background, personality or allocation of time. They do not include one's competence, dedication to feminism, talents or potential contribution to the movement. The former are the criteria one usually uses in determining one's friends. The latter are what any movement or organization has to use if it is going to be politically effective."

She defines, by default, politics as usual:  to form power networks one must avoid working with one's friends and work specifically with those who are talented, competent, dedicated, and willing to make contributions - not simply those that one likes or would choose, if one were not actually seeking to re/gain power.

Domination and effectiveness 

The dialectic between formal and informal power is critical:  "If the movement continues deliberately not to select who shall exercise power, it does not thereby abolish power. All it does is abdicate the right to demand that those who do exercise power and influence be responsible for it. If the movement continues to keep power as diffuse as possible because it knows it cannot demand responsibility from those who have it, it does prevent any group or person from totally dominating. But it simultaneously ensures that the movement is as ineffective as possible. Some middle ground between domination and ineffectiveness can and must be found."

Structurelessness 

Freeman advocated a power structure and claimed that "once the movement no longer clings tenaciously to the ideology of structurelessness, it will be free to develop those forms of organisation best suited to its healthy functioning. This does not mean that we should go to the other extreme and blindly imitate the traditional forms of organisation. But neither should we blindly reject them all. Some traditional techniques will prove useful, albeit not perfect; some will give us insights into what we should not do to obtain certain ends with minimal costs to the individuals in the movement. Mostly, we will have to experiment with different kinds of structuring and develop a variety of techniques to use for different situations. The 'lot system' is one such idea which has emerged from the movement. It is not applicable to all situations, but it is useful in some. Other ideas for structuring are needed. But before we can proceed to experiment intelligently, we must accept the idea that there is nothing inherently bad about structure itself - only its excessive use."

Politically effective principles 

Principles of democratic structuring that Freeman claimed were "politically effective also" included:

  Delegation of specific authority to specific individuals for specific tasks by democratic procedures. Letting people assume jobs or tasks by default only means they are not dependably done. If people are selected to do a task, preferably after expressing an interest or willingness to do it, they have made a commitment which cannot easily be ignored.
 Responsibility - requiring all those to whom authority has been delegated to be responsible to all those who selected them. This is how the group has control over people in positions of authority. Individuals may exercise power, but it is the group that has the ultimate say over how the power is exercised.
 Decentralization - distribution of authority among as many people as is reasonably possible. This prevents monopoly of power and requires those in positions of authority to consult with many others in the process of exercising it. It also gives many people an opportunity to have responsibility for specific tasks and thereby to learn specific skills.
 Rotating chair - rotating all key tasks among individuals. Responsibilities which are held too long by one person, formally or informally, come to be seen as that person's 'property' and are not relinquished or controlled by the group. If tasks are rotated frequently, the individual does not have time to learn the job well and be glad to do a good job.
 Labour specialization - allocation of tasks along rational criteria. Selecting someone for a position because they are liked by the group, or giving them hard work because they are disliked, serves neither the group nor the person in the long run. Ability, interest and responsibility have got to be the major concerns in such selection. People should be given an opportunity to learn skills they do not have, but this is best done through some sort of 'apprenticeship' programme rather than the 'sink or swim' method. Having a responsibility one can't handle well is demoralising. Being blackballed from what can be done well does not encourage developing of skills. Women were punished for being competent through most of human history.
 Open information flow - Diffusion of information to everyone as frequently as possible. Information is power. Access to information enhances one's power. When an informal network spreads new ideas and information among themselves outside the group, they are already engaged in the process of forming an opinion without the group participating. The more one knows about how things work, the more politically effective one can be.
 Equal power relationships imply equal access to resources needed by the group. This is not always perfectly possible, but should be striven for. A member who maintains a monopoly over a needed resource (like a printing press or a darkroom owned by a husband) can unduly influence the use of that resource. Skills and information are also resources. Members' skills and information can be equally available only when members are willing to teach what they know to others.

Freeman claimed that "when these principles are applied, they ensure that whatever structures are developed by different movement groups will be controlled by and be responsible to the group. The group of people in positions of authority will be organized in structures that are diffuse, flexible, open and temporary. They will not be in such an easy position to institutionalize their power because ultimate decisions will be made by the group at large. The group will have the power to determine who shall exercise authority within it."

References

Democracy
Political theories